A list of films produced in France in 1996.

External links
 1996 in France
 French films of 1996 at the Internet Movie Database
French films of 1996 at Cinema-francais.fr

1996
Films
French